A list of members of the Løgting from 1994 to 1998. The Løgting had 32 members this period.

Members of the Løgting

References
Løgtingið 150 – Hátíðarrit, vol. 2 (2002). (PDF)

 1994
1994 in the Faroe Islands
1995 in the Faroe Islands
1996 in the Faroe Islands
1997 in the Faroe Islands
1998 in the Faroe Islands
1994–1998